Sodium tetrasulfide is an inorganic compound with the formula Na2S4.  It is a yellow-orange solid that dissolves via hydrolysis in water.  It is a precursor to some specialty polymers and intermediates in prototypes of the sodium-sulfur battery.

Synthesis and structure
It is produced through the reaction between elemental sulfur and sodium hydrosulfide in alcoholic solution:
2NaSH + 4 S   →   Na2S4  +  H2S

The polysulfide anions adopt zig-zag chains of sulfur atoms.  The S-S distances are about 2.05 Å and the S-S-S-S dihedral angles are around 90°.

Reactions and applications
Upon treatment with acid, it is converted to hydrogen sulfide and elemental sulfur.  Treatment with alkylating agents gives organic polysulfides.  In one commercial application, it is used to produce the cross-linking agent bis(triethoxysilylpropyl)tetrasulfide:
Na2S4  +  2 ClC3H6Si(OEt)3  →   S4[C3H6Si(OEt)3]2  +  2 NaCl

Sometimes as a mixture with other polysulfides, sodium tetrasulfide is used to produce the polymer called thiokol. The reaction involves alkylation with ethylene chloride:
Na2S4  +  C2H4Cl2   →   1/n (C2H4)Sx]n  +  2 NaCl
These materials, which have the approximate formula (C2H4)Sx]n (x ~ 4), are highly resistant to degradation by solvents and acids.

References

Polysulfides
Sodium compounds